The Metgethen massacre was a massacre of German civilians by the Red Army in the Königsberg, East Prussia, suburb Metgethen, which is now Imeni Alexandra Kosmodemyanskogo in Russia's Kaliningrad Oblast, circa January–February 1945.

Timeline

During the Battle of Königsberg in 1945, Soviet forces attacking from the north of the Samland peninsula reached the Vistula Lagoon to the west of Königsberg on January 30, taking Metgethen in the process, a village with a railway station. After dark, they further advanced westward to Groß-Heydekrug. German forces recaptured Metgethen on 19 February in a successful bid to reopen the vital road and railway line between Königsberg and the Baltic Sea harbor of Pillau. According to German reports, mutilated corpses of civilians were discovered.

German findings
There are several contemporary reports by German military personnel stating that, among other things, women had been raped, mutilated, and killed, and that 32 civilians had been rounded up on the local tennis court and killed by an explosion. In one of the eyewitness reports, Captain Hermann Sommer, former staff officer of the fortress commander of Königsberg, Otto Lasch, stated:

The Library of Congress possesses an album of 26 mounted photographs, with the cover title  ('Picture report about the Germans murdered and desecrated by Bolshevists at Metgethen'). According to an ink stamp on its cover, this album had once been filed in the office of the commander of the Sicherheitspolizei at Königsberg.

See also
Nemmersdorf massacre
Red Army atrocities

Footnotes

References
Jürgen Thorwald: Die große Flucht: Es begann an der Weichsel. - Das Ende an der Elbe. Stuttgart: Steingrüben, 1963 (= Das moderne Sachbuch, 7), p. 167
 Silke Spieler (ed.): Vertreibung und Vertreibungsverbrechen, 1945 - 1948. Bericht des Bundesarchivs vom 28. Mai 1974, Archivalien und ausgewählte Erlebnisberichte.Bonn: Bundesarchiv Koblenz & Kulturstiftung der Deutschen Vertriebenen, 1989, p. 146-147
 Michael Wieck: Zeugnis vom Untergang Königsbergs: ein "Geltungsjude" berichtet. 3., verb. Aufl., Heidelberg: Schneider, 1989, p. 175-176
 Alfred-Maurice de Zayas: A Terrible Revenge: The Ethnic Cleansing of the East European Germans. New York: St. Martin's Press, 1994, p. 40-41

Further reading
 Michael Klonovsky: Preußen zahlt die Zeche: Article formerly published in Focus, 07/2005, p. 72-76 (German), quoting contemporary reports by Karl August Knorr and Hermann Sommer

1945 in Germany
Königsberg
Germany–Soviet Union relations
Soviet World War II crimes
World War II massacres